Hotel de señoritas is a 1979 Argentine comedy film directed by Enrique Dawi.

Cast
Jorge Martínez
Juan Carlos Dual
Elena Sedova
Patricia Dal
Gogó Andreu
Rudy Chernicoff
Vicente Rubino
Nené Malbrán
Toto Rey
Alberto Irizar
Adriana Quevedo
Marta Albertini
Carmen Barbieri
Marcos Zucker
Mario Sapag

External links
 

1979 films
1970s Spanish-language films
1979 comedy films
Films directed by Enrique Dawi
Argentine comedy films
1970s Argentine films